Wayne Horvitz (born 1955) is an American composer, keyboardist and record producer. He came to prominence in the Downtown scene of 1980s and '90s New York City, where he met his future wife, the singer, songwriter and pianist Robin Holcomb. He is noted for working with John Zorn's Naked City among others. Horvitz has since relocated to the Seattle, Washington area where he has several ongoing groups and has worked as an adjunct professor of composition at Cornish College of the Arts.

Biography
Horvitz, a "defiant cross-breeder of genres", has led the groups The President, Pigpen, Zony Mash, and the Four Plus One Ensemble. He has recorded or performed with John Zorn, Bill Frisell, Elliott Sharp, Danny Barnes, Tucker Martine,  Butch Morris, Fred Frith, Julian Priester, Phillip Wilson, Michael Shrieve, Carla Bley, Timothy Young, Bobby Previte, Skerik, Douglas September and others. He is perhaps most famous for being the keyboardist of the band Naked City. He has produced records for the World Saxophone Quartet, Human Feel, Marty Ehrlich, Fontella Bass, The Living Daylights, Bill Frisell and Eddie Palmieri.

As a composer, Horvitz has been commissioned by The Kitchen, The Kronos Quartet, Brooklyn Academy of Music, New World Records, The Seattle Chamber Players and Earshot Jazz.  He has received commissioning grants from Meet the Composer, The National Endowment for the Arts, The New York State Arts Council, The Mary Flagler Carey Trust, The Seattle Arts Commission, The Lila Wallace-Reader's Digest Fund and The Fund for U.S. Artists.  In 2002 he was awarded a Rockefeller MAP grant for the creation of a new piece, Joe Hill, for chamber orchestra and voice, which premiered in October 2004 in Seattle.  His 2003 composition, Whispers, Hymns and a Murmur for String Quartet and soloist, funded in part by a Seattle City Artist grant, premiered in March 2004.  This composition and his earlier string quartet, Mountain Language are released on the Tzadik label.  His newest string quartet composition, These Hills of Glory, was commissioned with support from 4Culture and the Mayors Office of Arts and Cultural Affairs.  His recent collaboration with Tucker Martine, Mylab, was on the top 10 CD list for 2004 in jazz in both the New Yorker and Amazon.com.  In February 2005 he received the Golden Ear award from Earshot Jazz for "Concert of the Year."

Works for theater and dance include music for the 1998 production of Death of a Salesman for Seattle's ACT theater (directed by Gordon Edelstein); productions of Ezra Pound's Elektra and the American premiere of Harold Pinter's Mountain Language, both directed by Carey Perloff.  In 1992 choreographer Paul Taylor created a new work, OZ, to eleven compositions by Wayne Horvitz in collaboration with the White Oak Dance Company.  Other theater and dance works include music for Bill Irwin's Broadway show, Strictly NY, and productions by the Liz Lerman Dance Exchange, Ammi Legendre, Nikki Apino and House of Dames and the Crispin Spaeth Dance Company.

Horvitz has also composed and produced music for a variety of video, film, television and other multimedia projects, including two projects with director Gus Van Sant, a full length score for PBS's Chihuly Over Venice, and two films about the creation of Seattle's EMP museum.  His 85-minute score to Charlie Chaplin's film The Circus, for two pianos, two clarinets, and violin premiered in January 2000 in Oporto, Portugal.

As of April 2007 Horvitz performs with Gravitas Quartet, Sweeter Than The Day and Varmint.  Since 2008, Horvitz has led The Golden Road, playing music from the early years of The Grateful Dead.  In December 2011, Horvitz opened the Royal Room, a live music venue in Columbia City, Seattle. Since that time he has developed his technique of conduction, a framework for conducted improvisation using hand gestures that refer to precomposed musical structures that draws on his previous work with Butch Morris.

Discography

Leader 
 No Place Fast (Parachute, 1979)
 Simple Facts (Theatre For Your Mother, 1981)
 Dinner at Eight (Dossier, 1985)
 This New Generation (Elektra/Musician, 1985)
 Monologue (Cavity Search, 1997)
 Film Works (Avant, 2003)

Wayne Horvitz, 4+1 Ensemble (+ Reggie Watts, Eyvind Kang, Julian Priester, Tucker Martine)
 4+1 Ensemble (Intuition, 1998)
 From a Window (Avant, 2001)

Wayne Horvitz, Gravitas Quartet  ( + Ron Miles, Peggy Lee, Sara Schoenbeck)
 Way Out East (Songlines, 2006)

Wayne Horvitz, Sweeter Than the Day ( + Timothy Young, Keith Lowe, Andy Roth)
 American Bandstand - later released as Forever (Songlines, 2000)
 Sweeter Than the Day (Songlines, 2001)
 Live at the Rendezvous (Liquid City, 2005)

Pigpen (Wayne Horvitz, Briggan Krauss, Mike Stone, Fred Chalenor)
 Halfrack (Tim/Kerr, 1993)
Kind of Dead b/w Pattern 56 Interlude 7" single (Cavity Search, 1993) 
 V as in Victim (Avant, 1993)
 Live in Poland (Cavity Search, 1994)
Miss Ann (Tim/Kerr, 1995)
 Daylight (Tim/Kerr, 1997)

The President (Wayne Horvitz, Bobby Previte, Dave Sewelson, Kevin Cosgrove, Joe Gallant / Stew Cutler, Doug Wieselman, Dave Hofstra)
 The President (Dossier, 1987)
 Bring Yr Camera (Elektra/Musician, 1988)
 Miracle Mile (Elektra Nonesuch, 1992)

Zony Mash (Wayne Horvitz, Timothy Young, Fred Chalenor / Keith Lowe, Andy Roth, Briggan Krauss)
 Cold Spell (Knitting Factory, 1997)
 Brand Spankin' New (Knitting Factory, 1998)
 Upper Egypt (Knitting Factory, 1999)
 Live in Seattle (Liquid City, 2002)
Live at the Royal Room (Fully Altered Media, 2012)

Co-leader 
Robin Holcomb / Wayne Horvitz
 Solos (Songlines, 2004)

Wayne Horvitz, Butch Morris, William Parker Trio
 Some Order, Long Understood (Black Saint, 1982)

Wayne Horvitz, Butch Morris, Bobby Previte Trio
 Nine Below Zero (Sound Aspects, 1987)
 Todos Santos ... Play Robin Holcomb (Sound Aspects, 1988)

Wayne Horvitz / Ron Samworth/ Peggy Lee/ Dylan van der Schyff
 Intersection Poems (Spool, 2005)

Mylab (Tucker Martine, Wayne Horvitz…)
 Mylab (Sony BMG, 2004)

New York Composers' Orchestra (Wayne Horvitz, Herb Robertson, Steven Bernstein, Marty Ehrlich, Ray Anderson, Robin Holcomb,…)
 NY Composers Orchestra (New World, 1990)
 First Program in Standard Time (New World, 1992)

Ponga (Wayne Horvitz, Dave Palmer, Bobby Previte, Skerik) 
 Ponga (Loosegroove, 1998)
 Psychological (P-vine, 2000)

Donald Rubinstein, Wayne Horvitz and Zony Mash
 A Man Without Love (Blue Horse, 1998)

The Sonny Clark Memorial Quartet (John Zorn, Wayne Horvitz, Ray Drummond, Bobby Previte)
 Voodoo (Black Saint, 1985)

John Zorn, Elliott Sharp, Bobby Previte, Wayne Horvitz
 Downtown Lullaby (Depth of Field, 1998)

As sideman
With Bill Frisell
Is That You? (Elektra/Musician, 1990)
Good Dog, Happy Man (Nonesuch, 1999)
With Robin Holcomb 
Larks, They Crazy (Sound Aspects, 1988)
Robin Holcomb (Elektra/Musician, 1990)
Rockabye (Elektra/Musician, 1992)
The Big Time (Nonesuch, 2002)
The Point of It All (Songlines, 2010)
With Bobby Previte
Empty Suits (Gramavision, 1990)
Slay the Suitors (Avant, 1993)
With Michael Shrieve
Fascination (CMP, 1994)
Two Doors "In the Palace of Dreams" (CMP, 1995) With Hal Wilner and James Grauerholz on William S. BurroughsNaked Lunch (Warner, 1995)
Let Me Hang You (Khannibalism, 2016)With John Zorn'Archery (Parachute, 1981)Locus Solus (Rift, 1983)The Big Gundown (Nonesuch, 1985)Cobra (Hathut, 1987)Spillane (Elektra/Nonesuch, 1987)Naked City Live, Vol. 1: The Knitting Factory 1989 (Tzadik, 2002) Naked City (Elektra/Nonesuch, 1990)Torture Garden (Toy Factory, 1990)Grand Guignol (Avant, 1992)Heretic (Avant, 1992)Leng Tch'e (Toy Factory, 1992)Radio (Avant, 1993)Absinthe (Avant, 1993)The Bribe'' (Tzadik, 1998)

Composer 
 Seattle Chamber Players - Otis Spann and Other Compositions, 2001
 Koehne Quartet - Whispers, Hymns and a Murmur, Tzadik, 2006

References

External links

 Official site
 Discography by Patrice Roussel

1955 births
Living people
Musicians from Seattle
American jazz keyboardists
Tzadik Records artists
Elektra Records artists
Avant-garde jazz pianists
Cornish College of the Arts faculty
Cavity Search Records artists
21st-century pianists
21st-century American keyboardists
Naked City (band) members
Ponga (band) members